The 1972 Argentine Grand Prix was a Formula One motor race held at the Buenos Aires circuit on 23 January 1972. It was race 1 of 12 in both the 1972 World Championship of Drivers and the 1972 International Cup for Formula One Manufacturers. The 95-lap race was won by Tyrrell driver Jackie Stewart after he started from second position. Denny Hulme finished second for the McLaren team and Ferrari driver Jacky Ickx came in third.

The race was notable for the début of local driver and future Grand Prix winner Carlos Reutemann, who scored pole position in his Brabham BT34.

Classification

Qualifying

Race

Championship standings after the race

Drivers' Championship standings

Constructors' Championship standings

Note: Only the top five positions are included for both sets of standings.

References

Argentine Grand Prix
Argentine Grand Prix
Grand Prix
Argentine Grand Prix